Juan Fernando Calle Hurtado (born 18 July 1999) is a Colombian cyclist, who currently rides for UCI ProTeam .

Major results
2016
 3rd Overall Vuelta a Colombia Juniors
1st Stage 2

References

External links

1999 births
Living people
Colombian male cyclists
Sportspeople from Antioquia Department
21st-century Colombian people